The Rebels was a rockabilly band from Dallas, Texas that recorded "School of Rock 'n Roll" and "Straight Skirt" with Gene Summers. The group consisted of James McClung (guitar), Gary Moon (drums) and Benny Williams (slap bass). They were soon joined by pianist Bill Brown who played on some of their early personal appearances. They were one of the first rock 'n roll bands to record using the name "Rebels" (February 1, 1958), preceding Duane Eddy's Rebels by at least six months and the "Wild Weekend" Rebels by more than two years.

History
The Rebels began their musical career in 1957 while in high school at Duncanville, Texas, joining forces with another classmate and singer Gene Summers. They appeared together on high school assembly programs and soon were playing gigs at the Carswell Air Force Base which at that time was located Northwest of Ft. Worth, Tx. At one of these shows they met a country music comedian nicknamed "Cornbread" who was appearing on a TV show hosted by Neal Jones on KRLD-TV in Dallas. Cornbread was impressed with Summers and The Rebels and invited them to appear on the TV program. This led them to a regular, weekly spot on another television program, also on KRLD, called "Joe Bill's Country Picnic" in the fall of 1957. It was while appearing on this show that they were discovered by songwriter Jed Tarver. He wanted them to record his songs "Straight Skirt", "Nervous", "I'll Never Be Lonely", "Gotta Lotta That" and "Twixteen". With the assistance of their manager/agent, Thomas Wolverton, Tarver was able to get them an audition with Jan Records, a newly formed Dallas label.

Their first release on Jan was on February 1, 1958 and featured Tarver's "Straight Skirt" composition flipped with an original James McClung song "School of Rock 'n Roll". "Straight Skirt" became a regional chart hit and The Rebels found themselves appearing at record hops, concerts and radio and television shows throughout the country. After touring for several months, Williams and Moon decided to pursue other interests and left the band. McClung and Summers replaced them with other musicians and The Rebels continued to perform until 1961. After this, the group disbanded. Summers continued a solo career and was still recording and touring well into the 21st century in both the USA and abroad.

References 

Solly, Bob. (2005). "100 Greatest Rock 'n' Roll Records". Diamond Publishing Company LTD, UK. . UPC 9-771746805006.
Go Cat Go by Craig Morrison (published by University Of Illinois Press United States 1998)
Article and sessionography in issue No. 15  of New Kommotion Magazine 1977 UK
Article and sessionography in issue 23 (1980) of New Kommotion Magazine UK
Feature article with photo spread in issue 53 of Bill Griggs' Rockin' 50s Magazine, 2002 United States
Feature article with photo spread in issue 54 of Bill Griggs' Rockin' 50s Magazine, 2002 United States
Feature article and sessionography in issue 74 (1999) of Rockin' Fifties Magazine Germany
Full Cover photo and article in issue 28 of UK Rock Magazine, 2006 UK

Liner notes, The Ultimate School Of Rock & Roll CD 1997 United States
Liner notes, Rockaboogie Shake CD 1999 UK
Liner notes, School Of Rock 'n Roll 1994, Netherlands

Rockabilly Hall of Fame Page  retrieved on August 6, 2008.

Rockabilly music groups
Musical groups established in 1957
Musical groups disestablished in 1961
Musical groups from Dallas
Jubilee Records artists
Apex Records artists
University of Texas at Arlington alumni